Joonas Lyytinen (born April 4, 1995) is a Finnish professional ice hockey defenceman. He is currently playing under contract to Timrå IK of the Swedish Hockey League (SHL). Lyytinen was selected by the Nashville Predators in the 5th round, 132nd overall, at the 2014 NHL Entry Draft.

Playing career
Lyytinen made his Liiga debut playing with KalPa during the 2013–14 Liiga season.

After spending the entirety of his youth career and the first four seasons in the Ligga with Kalpa, Lyytinen left the club in signing a one-year deal with fellow Finnish club, Oulun Kärpät, on May 2, 2017. However, on June 16, 2017, Lyytinen agreed to a two-year, entry-level contract to join draft club, the Nashville Predators.

During the final year of his entry-level contract in the 2018–19 season, having failed to make an impression with the Predators' American Hockey League affiliate, the Milwaukee Admirals, Lyytinen was placed on waivers in order for a mutual termination of his contract on December 28, 2018. Returning to Finland as a free agent, Lyytinen was signed to a three-year contract with HIFK of the Liiga on December 30, 2018.

In his fifth year with HIFK, Lyytinen made 7 appearances in the 2022–23 season before leaving the club and moving to the SHL in joining Swedish outfit Timrå IK on a two-year contract on 19 October 2022.

Career statistics

Regular season and playoffs

International

References

External links

1995 births
Living people
Sportspeople from Espoo
Finnish ice hockey defencemen
Atlanta Gladiators players
HIFK (ice hockey) players
KalPa players
Milwaukee Admirals players
Nashville Predators draft picks
Norfolk Admirals (ECHL) players
Timrå IK players